Konar Shib (also Romanized as Konār Shīb; also known as Konār Shahr, Konār Shīr, and Sūreg) is a village in Hudian Rural District, in the Central District of Dalgan County, Sistan and Baluchestan Province, Iran. At the 2006 census, its population was 71, in 16 families.

References 

Populated places in Dalgan County